Stasera niente di nuovo (literally: Tonight nothing is new) is a 1942 Italian drama film directed by Mario Mattoli and starring Alida Valli.

Plot
Cesare, a journalist, recognizes among some prostitutes arrested by the police, the young woman that saved his life some time earlier, without his having learned her identity. He tries to help the woman, Maria, and convince her to change her life, but without success.

Later on, Maria asks Cesare for his help.  She is dying in a hospital, but cannot tell her parents, because, some time earlier, she had told them that she was married.  So, in the last hours of her life, Cesare marries Maria, and then calls for her family to be with her.

Cast
 Alida Valli - Maria
 Carlo Ninchi - Cesare Manti
 Antonio Gandusio - Il dottore Moriesi
 Giuditta Rissone - Clelia, la padrona di casa
 Dina Galli - La portinaia
 Armando Migliari - Il direttore del giornale
 Aldo Rubens - Giorgio, il ballerino
 Paolo Bonecchi - Il fattorino del giornale
 Achille Majeroni - Il professore ladro
 Tina Lattanzi - La principale dell'istituto

References

External links

1942 films
1942 drama films
1940s Italian-language films
Italian black-and-white films
Films directed by Mario Mattoli
Italian drama films
1940s Italian films